The psychology of self is the study of either the cognitive, conative or affective representation of one's identity, or the subject of experience. The earliest formulation of the self in modern psychology derived from the distinction between the self as I, the subjective knower, and the self as Me, the object that is known.

Current views of the self in psychology position the self as playing an integral part in human motivation, cognition, affect, and social identity. It may be the case that we can now usefully attempt to ground experience of self in a neural process with cognitive consequences, which will give us insight into the elements of which the complex multiply situated selves of modern identity are composed.

The self has many facets that help make up integral parts of it, such as self-awareness, self-esteem, self-knowledge, and self-perception. All parts of the self enable people to alter, change, add, and modify aspects of themselves in order to gain social acceptance in society.

A useful accounting of contributing factors to what we call "selfhood" is the self gradually emerges and arises at the intersection between:
the habits in our biological-metabolic processes,
the sociocultural habits of local culture inculcated into us,
our role models, good and bad,
how much responsibility the individual takes to make healthy choices gain and again, develop and strengthen their own chooser self.

Parts of the self

The self is an automatic part of every human being, in which enables people to relate to others. The self is made up of three main parts that, incorporated, allow for the self to maintain its function. The parts of the self include: Self-knowledge, interpersonal self, and the agent self.

Self-knowledge

Self-knowledge is sometimes referred to as self-concept. This feature allows for people to gather information and beliefs about themselves. A person's self-awareness, self-esteem, and self-deception all fall under the self-knowledge part of self.  We learn about ourselves through our looking-glass selves, introspection, social comparisons, and self-perception.

The looking glass self is a term to describe a theory that people learn about themselves through other people. In the looking-glass self proposal, a person visualizes how they appear to others, the person imagines how other people will judge them, and they then develop a response to the judgment they receive from other people. The response will likely be something viewed as pride or shame about themselves. The looking-glass self has proved to be partially accurate and inaccurate. A person's self-concept does not solely depend on how others view them. A person can view themselves as friendly; however they may appear to be quiet and uptight to another person that may not know them very well.

Introspection refers to the manner in which a person gathers information about oneself through mental functions and emotions. Although a person might not know why they are thinking or feeling in such a way, they are able to know what it is they are feeling. However, developmental stages in life might affect introspection. In a Rosenburg study, children up to a certain stage in development showed that they knew that their parents actually knew them better than they knew themselves. Also, studies done by Nisbett and Wilson uncovered the fact that people might not actually know what they are thinking all of the time. In one particular study, they discovered that many people bought the first stockings that they saw and gave the reasoning behind their choice for buying being based on the color or softness. So, in conclusion, introspection is a way of gaining knowledge about yourself through your inner emotions and thinking, however it is a conscious part of the brain. The automatic part of the brain can make us do a lot of unconscious acts that people have no reasoning for.

Social comparison is regarded as the way in which we compare ourselves to other people around us. By looking to other people, we can rate our work and behaviors as good, neutral, or bad. The most beneficial or useful comparisons are those of people that are in the same category as ourselves. For example, a high school football player would be more appropriate in comparing themselves to an all-star high school football player, rather than a Super Bowl-winning football player with over 10 years of experience. An upward social comparison refers to a person comparing oneself to a person that is perceived as better than them in a particular area. This can be either motivational or discouraging to the person making the comparison. A downward social comparison refers to a person comparing oneself to a person that is perceived as worse than them, which can make the person making the comparison feel better about their self.

The self-perception theory is another theory in which a person infers about themselves through their behavior. Their behavior can give them insight as to how their feelings and emotions truly are. If a person regards their self as being smart, however they continuously receive bad grades over the years, that person might rearrange their thinking that they are not as smart as they previously thought. This helps readjust a person's thoughts in order to match their behavior better.

Self-knowledge is a desire for the majority of human beings. In knowing about ourselves, we are more capable of knowing how to be socially acceptable and desirable. We seek out self-knowledge due to the appraisal motive, self-enhancement motive, and consistency motive. The appraisal motive describes the desire to learn the truth about oneself in general. The self-enhancement motive is the desire to learn about one's good qualities only. The consistency motive is the desire to receive reinforcement of those preconceived notions that a person has about their self. This feedback will verify the thoughts and beliefs they already had relating to their self.

Self-awareness can be divided into two categories: private self-awareness and public self-awareness. Private self-awareness is defined as the self looking inward at oneself, including emotions, thoughts, beliefs, and feelings. All of these cannot be discovered by anyone else. Public self-awareness is defined by gathering information about your self through the perceptions of others. The actions and behaviors that others show towards a person will help that person establish a sense of how others perceive them. For example, if a person likes to sing, however many other people discourage their singing, that person can conclude that they might not be the best at singing. Therefore, in this situation, they are gaining public self-awareness about an aspect of themselves.

Self-esteem describes how a person evaluates their self positively or negatively. Four factors that contribute to self-esteem are the reactions we get from other people, how we compare people to ourselves, social roles, and our identification. Our social roles can sometimes be conceived as higher intelligence or ability, such as an Olympic athlete or biotechnologist. Other social roles might be stigmatized as being negative, such as a criminal or homeless person. People with high self-esteem view their selves as containing positive traits. They are more willing to take more risks and aim for success. People with high self-esteem tend to be confident, gain self-acceptance, do not worry as much about what others think about them, and think more optimistically. In contrast, people with low self-esteem view their selves as containing few or no positive traits, rather than viewing their selves as containing negative traits. It is rare for a person to rate their overall self as being terrible. People with low self-esteem typically:

do not wish to fail
are less confident in their success rate
have confused and diverged notions about their self (self-concept confusion)
focus on self-protection more so than self-enhancement
are more prone to emotional imbalances
are less confident about their success than high self-esteemed people
worry what others think about them consistently
have more pessimistic thinking
desire to resemble others more than high self-esteemed people

Our self-concept entails the thoughts, feelings, and beliefs that each of us uniquely foster. However, many psychologists have questioned whether our self-concept is more realistic or filled with illusions about ourselves and the world around us. Clinical psychologists have studied depressed people with perceived low self-esteem in order to observe if their perceptions were fabricated or not. Contrary to their hypothesis, they found that depressed people have a more realistic view of the world, the qualities they obtain, and the control they have over situations in their life. It was proposed by psychologists Shelley Taylor and Jonathon Brown that the majority of people in normal-functioning mental states display and are instilled with positive illusions including:

overestimating their own good qualities
their control over happenings in their life
an unrealistic portrayal of optimism

Positive illusions remain constant for the majority of one's life due to self-deception. Self-deception strategies are mental tricks of a person's mind that hide the truth and constitute false beliefs. Due to self-deception, people are able to obtain resiliency upon negative events that might occur throughout life. This also can reinforce different ideas or thoughts that the person wishes and hopes for. The self-serving bias is a strategy in which a person titles acknowledgment for success and rejects blame for failure. For example, a person who wins a track meet would glorify their ability as an athlete. However, if that person were to come in last in the meet, the person would most likely put blame on constituting factors such as a muscle cramp or previous injury preventing a good performance. Another strategy that people use is greater criticism involving bad feedback rather than good. A person would judge a situation more harshly when they did worse, while the opposite would occur for a situation that entailed good feedback.

Interpersonal self
Interpersonal self can also be referred to as your public self. This feature allows for social connection to others. With the interpersonal self, a person is able to display themselves to the others around them. Interpersonal self is apparent in situations of self-presentation, being a group member or partner in a relationship, a person's social roles, and their reputation. For example, a person might show confidence and determination in their work atmosphere, whereas they show more of their emotional and nurturing side in their romantic relationship.

Social roles are defined as the parts that a person plays in different situations and with other people. Our roles change in order to fit the "expected" behaviors in various scenarios. For example, a person may be a mother, a doctor, a wife, and daughter. Their behavior would most likely change in their transition from being a doctor to coming home to their daughter.

Social norms constitute the "unwritten rules" that we have about how to act in certain scenarios and with various people in our lives. For example, when a person is in a classroom, they are more likely to be quiet and attentive; whereas at a party, they are more likely to be socially engaged and standing. Norms act as guidelines that shape our behavior. Without them, there would not be any order, as well as lack of understanding in situations in society.

Agent self
The agent self is known as the executive function that allows for actions. This is how we, as individuals, make choices and utilize our control in situations and actions. The agent self resides over everything that involves decision making, self-control, taking charge in situations, and actively responding. A person might desire to eat unhealthy foods, however it is their agent self that allows that person to choose to avoid eating them and make a healthier food choice.

In clinical psychology

Jungian archetype of the self 

In classical Jungian analysis, the Self is the central archetype of several archetypes, which are a priori or predispositions of responding to the world in particular ways. The Self signifies the coherent whole, unifying both the conscious and unconscious mind of a person. The Self, according to Jung, is the most important and difficult archetype to understand.  Followers of Analytical psychology regard it as paradoxical, such that it is the subject of continuing debate. (See for example, Louis Zinkin) It is fully realized as the product of individuation, which is defined as the process of integrating all the elements of the personality. The Self can appear to the individual either impersonally as dreams and images (circle, mandala, crystal, or stone) or personally (royal couple, divine child, or another divine symbol). Spiritual figures, such as Christ and Mohammed, can also be seen as symbols of the Self, because they represent actualisation, unity and equilibrium. The Wise Old Woman/Man can also serve as 'a symbolic personification of the Self'.

What distinguishes classical Jungian psychology from earlier theories is the idea that there are two centers of the personality. The ego is the center of conscious identity, whereas the Self is the center of the total personality—including consciousness, the unconscious, including the ego. The Self is both the whole and the center. While the ego is a self-contained little circle off the center contained within the whole, the Self can be understood as the greater circle. People know of this Self, yet it is not known. Jung expresses it in this way: "If the Self could be wholly experienced, it would be a limited experience, whereas in reality its experience is unlimited and endless.... If I were one with the Self I would have knowledge of everything, I would speak Sanskrit, read cuneiform script, know the events that took place in pre-history be acquainted with the life of other planets, etc."

The Self, besides being the centre of the psyche, is also autonomous, meaning that it exists outside of time and space. Jung also called the Self an imago Dei. The Self is the source of dreams and often appears as an authority figure in dreams with the ability to perceive events not yet occurred or guide one in the present.

Kohut's formulation

Heinz Kohut initially proposed a bipolar self compromising two systems of narcissistic perfection: 1) a system of ambitions and, 2) a system of ideals.  Kohut called the pole of ambitions the narcissistic self (later, the grandiose self), while the pole of ideals was designated the idealized parental imago. According to Kohut, these poles of the self represented natural progressions in the psychic life of infants and toddlers.

Kohut argued that when the child's ambitions and exhibitionistic strivings were chronically frustrated, arrests in the grandiose self led to the preservation of a false, expansive sense of self that could manifest outwardly in the visible grandiosity of the frank narcissist, or remain hidden from view, unless discovered in a narcissistic therapeutic transference (or selfobject transference) that would expose these primitive grandiose fantasies and strivings.  Kohut termed this form of transference a mirror transference.  In this transference, the strivings of the grandiose self are mobilized and the patient attempts to use the therapist to gratify these strivings.

Kohut proposed that arrests in the pole of ideals occurred when the child suffered chronic and excessive disappointment over the failings of early idealized figures.  Deficits in the pole of ideals were associated with the development of an idealizing transference to the therapist who becomes associated with the patient's primitive fantasies of omnipotent parental perfection.

Kohut believed that narcissistic injuries were inevitable and, in any case, necessary to temper ambitions and ideals with realism through the experience of more manageable frustrations and disappointments.  It was the chronicity and lack of recovery from these injuries (arising from a number of possible causes) that he regarded as central to the preservation of primitive self systems untempered by realism.

According to the 1984 book, How Does Analysis Cure, Kohut's observation of patients led him to propose two additional forms of transference associated with self deficits: 1) the twinship and, 2) the merger transference.  In his later years, Kohut believed that selfobject needs were both present and quite varied in normal individuals, as well as in narcissistic individuals.  To be clear, selfobjects are not external persons.  Kohut and Wolf, 1978 explain:

"Self objects are objects which we experience as part of our self; the expected control over them is, therefore, closer to the concept of control which a grownup expects to have over his own body and mind than to the concept of control which he expects to have over others. (p.413)"

Kohut's notion of the self can be difficult to grasp because it is experience-distant, although it is posited based upon experience-near observation of the therapeutic transference.  Kohut relied heavily on empathy as a method of observation.  Specifically, the clinician's observations of their own feelings in the transference help the clinician see things from the subjective view of the patient—to experience the world in ways that are closer to the way the patient experiences it. (note: Kohut did not regard empathy as curative. Empathy is a method of observation).

Winnicott's selves

Donald Winnicott distinguished what he called the "true self" from the "false self" in the human personality, considering the true self as one based on the individual's sense of being, not doing, something which was rooted in the experiencing body. As he memorably put it to Harry Guntrip, 'You know about "being active", but not about "just growing, just breathing"': it was the latter qualities that went to form the true self.

Nevertheless, Winnicott did not undervalue the role of the false self in the human personality, regarding it in fact as a necessary form of defensive organization – a kind of caretaker, a survival suit behind the protection of which the true self was able to continue to exist.
Five levels of false self organization were identified by Winnicott, running along a kind of continuum. 
 In the most severe instance,  the false self completely replaces and ousts the true self, leaving the latter a mere possibility.  
 Less severely, the false self protects the true self, which remains unactualized - for Winnicott a clear example of a clinical condition organised for the positive goal of preserving the individual in spite of abnormal environmental conditions of the environment.
 Closer to health, the false self supports the individual's search for conditions that will allow the true self to recover its well-being - its own identity.
 Even closer to health, we find the false self "... established on the basis of identifications".
 Finally, in a healthy person, the false self is composed of that which facilitates social behavior, the manners and courtesy that allows for a smooth social life, with emotions expressed in socially acceptable forms.

As for the true self, Winnicott linked it both to playing, and to a kind of  "hide and seek"' designed to protect creative ownership of one's real self against exploitation, without entirely forfeiting the ability to relate to others.

Berne's transactional analysis

In his transactional analysis theory Eric Berne distinguished the personality's ego states - Parent, Adult and Child - from what he called 'the real Self, the one that can move from one ego state to another'.<ref>Eric Berne, What Do You Say After You Say Hello? (1974) p. 276</ref>
 The parent ego consists of borrowed behaviors and feelings from previous caregivers. The parent ego can consist of either the Nurturing or Critical Parent.  The Nurturing Parent contains a more loving nature, whereas the Critical (or Prejudiced) Parent consists of preconceived ideas, thoughts, and behaviors learned from previous parents or caregivers. Some of this information can be beneficial, while others are not.
 The adult ego is otherwise known as our data-processing center. This ego state is able to judge information based on facts, rather than emotions or preconceived beliefs.
 The child ego is identified as the state that holds all of our memories, emotions, and feelings. People carry this ego state with them all of the time and can reflect back on it at any time. This state can also be divided into two segments: the Free (or Natural) child and the Adapted (and/or Rebellious) child. The Free child represents spontaneity, creativity, and a direct way of perceiving the world. Intimate relationships are able to form due to a person's contact with their own inner child. The less a person is in touch with their inner child, the less they are able to form intimate relationships with other people. The Adapted child is the state in which people are able to comply and respond with parental commands and messages. If a parental command is viewed as too strong and demanding, a child ego can rebel against it, which is why this state can also become the Rebellious Child.
Berne considered that 'the feeling of "Self" is a mobile one. It can reside in any of the three ego states at any given moment, and can jump from one to the other as occasion arises'.

A person's tone, gestures, choice of words, posture, and emotional state can portray which ego state they are currently in. By knowing about their own ego states, a person can use each one in particular situations in order to enhance their experience or make new social connections. For example, a person would most likely want to be in a Free Child state along with the Adult state while attending a party in order to maximize the fun they are having while also being able to make wise choices.

Transactions is another concept in the transactional theory that relates to how people of a certain ego state interact with people of the same or different ego state at a particular moment. Straight transactions are complementary and result in clear communication among other people. On the contrary, crossed transactions are of diverging ego states that make communication either hard or frustrating. These provoke emotional stress and negative feedback. Nevertheless, Berne saw the Self as the most valuable part of the personality: 'when people get to know each other well, they penetrate into the depths where this real Self resides, and that is the part of the other person they respect and love'

Rogers on self and self-concept
Carl Rogers' theory is that "people use the term self concept to refer to all the information and beliefs you have as an individual regarding your own nature, unique qualities, and typical behaviors." Rogers thought that people develop through relationships with others and also in relation to themselves. An encouraging environment helps people towards this development.

Commenting on his clients' search for a real self, Rogers quoted with approval Kierkegaard's statement that "the most common despair is to be in despair at not choosing, or willing, to be oneself; but that the deepest form of despair is to choose 'to be another than himself'. On the other hand, 'to will to be that self which one truly is, is indeed the opposite of despair'".

In social psychology

Symbolic interactionism stresses the 'social construction of an individual's sense of self' through two main methods: 'In part the self emerges through interaction with others....But the self is a product of social structure as well as of face-to-face interaction'. This aspect of social psychology emphasizes the theme of mutual constitution of the person and situation. Instead of focusing on the levels of class, race, and gender structure, this perspective seeks to understand the self in the way an individual lives their life on a moment-by-moment basis.

Social psychology acknowledges that "one of the most important life tasks each of us faces is understanding both who we are and how we feel about ourselves". This allows us to better understand ourselves, abilities, and preferences so that we are able to make choices and decisions that suit us best. However, rather than absolute knowledge, it would seem that 'a healthy sense of self calls for both accurate self-knowledge and protective self-enhancement, in just the right amounts at just the right times.'

Self as an emergent phenomena

In dynamical social psychology as proposed by Nowak et al., the self is rather an emergent property that emerges as an experiential phenomenon from the interaction of psychological perceptions and experience. In this orientation, which draws from physics and biology, psychology is approached with the formula involving the whole as not the sum of parts since new properties emerge from the overview of system. This is also hinted in dynamical evolutionary social psychology by Douglas Kenrick et al. where a set of decision rules generates complex behaviour.

Memory and the self

Memory and the self are interconnected with each other that, combined, can be defined as the Self-Memory System (SMS). The self is viewed as a combination of memories and self-images (working self). Conway proposes that a person's long-term memory and working self are dependent on each other. Our prior knowledge of our self puts constraints on what our working self is and the working self modifies the access to our long-term memory, as well as, what it consists of.

One view of the Self, following from John Locke, sees it as a product of episodic memory. It has been suggested that transitory mental constructions within episodic memory form a self-memory system that grounds the goals of the working self, but research upon those with amnesia find they have a coherent sense of self based upon preserved conceptual autobiographical knowledge, and semantic facts, and so conceptual knowledge rather than episodic memory.

Both episodic and semantic memory systems have been proposed to generate a sense of self-identity: personal episodic memory enables the phenomenological continuity of identity, while personal semantic memory generates the narrative continuity of identity. "The nature of personal narratives depends on highly conceptual and ‘story-like' information about one's life, which resides at the general event level of autobiographical memory and is thus unlikely to rely on more event-specific
episodic systems."

 Implicit theories and self-concepts 
A two-step process for recalling past states, proposed by Ross, suggests that:
 The current state of attribute or belief is assessed
 A theory of stability or change is invoked
 Steps 1 and 2 are combined to infer the earlier state of attribute or belief
This theory suggests that recollection of past states would be biased if a person's state has changed but they expect no change to have occurred, or if the state has remained constant when a change was expected.

For example, an implicit theory of stability is often invoked when assessing political allegiances, therefore if this allegiance actually changes, recollection of past allegiance will be incorrect, and assumed to be the same as the current political identification.

An implicit theory of change is invoked when a change in an attribute over time is expected. One example of this is a study by Conway and Ross, which demonstrates that if a change in skill is expected, but there is no actual improvement, people will believe that their past skill state was worse than it was.

 Recalling Pain 
In general recollection of pain is fairly accurate, although differences are seen between recollection of acute and chronic pain. Research suggests that recall for acute pain is more accurate than recall for chronic pain.

An interesting phenomenon seen in recollection of pain in the self is the peak-end phenomenon. Research has shown that when enduring painful experiences, people will 'prefer' more drawn out experiences that end with lower levels of pain, over shorter experiences that end with higher levels of pain, even though the shorter experiences provide less pain overall.

Recalled ratings of pain are more closely related to a combination of the peak pain in the experience, and the end pain of the experience. Whilst the length of the experience factors in very little, there is a 'duration neglect' when recollecting painful experiences.

Critiques of the concept
'Selfhood' or complete autonomy is a common Western approach to psychology and models of self are employed constantly in areas such as psychotherapy and self-help. Edward E. Sampson (1989) argues that the preoccupation with independence is harmful in that it creates racial, sexual and national divides and does not allow for observation of the self-in-other and other-in-self.

The very notion of selfhood has been attacked on the grounds that it is seen as necessary for the mechanisms of advanced capitalism to function. In Inventing our selves: Psychology, power, and personhood, Nikolas Rose (1998) proposes that psychology is now employed as a technology that allows humans to buy into an invented and arguably false sense of self. In this way, 'Foucault's theories of self have been extensively developed by Rose to explore techniques of governance via self-formation...the self has to become an enterprising subject, acquiring cultural capital in order to gain employment', thus contributing to self-exploitation.

It is suggested by Kohut that for an individual to talk about, explain, understand or judge oneself is linguistically impossible, since it requires the self to understand its self''.  This is seen as philosophically invalid, being self-referential, or reification, also known as a circular argument. Thus, if actions arise so that the self attempts self-explanation, confusion may well occur within linguistic mental pathways and processes.

As for the theorists of the self, Winnicott has his critics, suggesting that his theory of the way 'the False Self is invented to manage a prematurely important object...enacts a kind of dissociated regard or recognition of the object' is itself rooted in 'his own childhood experience of trying to "make my living" by keeping his mother alive'.

The self has long been considered as the central element and support of any experience. The self is not 'permanently stuck into the heart of consciousness'.
"I am not always as intensively aware of me as an agent, as I am of my actions. That results from the fact that I perform only part of my actions, the other part being conducted by my thought, expression, practical operations, and so on."

See also

References

External links
Definitions of Various Self Constructs - Self-esteem, self-efficacy, self-confidence & self-concept.
Discussion of Self – Page of the Emotional Competency website.
Theory of Self - Proposed by an autistic to explain autism
Images of the Self
False self

Psychological
Ego psychology
Personal development

cs:Bytostné já
da:Selvet (psykologi)
fr:Soi (psychologie)
ja:自己
sk:Selbst
sr:Ја
sv:Självet
yi:זעיל
zh:自性